Craig G. Matthews served as President, CFO and Chief Operating Officer of KeySpan. He received a BS degree from Rutgers University and an MS degree from NYU Poly.

References

Polytechnic Institute of New York University alumni
American chief financial officers
American chief operating officers
Rutgers University alumni
Living people
Year of birth missing (living people)